"Sister" is the debut single by Australian pop music duo, Sister2Sister, released on 4 October 1999. It reached number three in Australia, number 14 in New Zealand, number 18 on the UK Singles Chart, and number 50 in Ireland.

Charts performance
In Australia, the single was a huge success. It debuted on the ARIA Singles Chart at number 14, then after several weeks climbed inside the top 10; it peaked at number three on 12 December 1999. It spent a total of 20 weeks inside the top 50.

In New Zealand, the single debuted on the RIANZ Singles Chart at number 14 and fell out quickly, spending eight weeks in the top 50. Two weeks after leaving the top 50, it re-entered at number 26, then fell and rose for a further five weeks before exiting for the last time, bringing its week total to 14.

On the UK Singles Chart, "Sister" debuted at number 18, before falling 17 places the next week. It spent two more weeks in the top 100, bringing its total weeks to four. In Ireland, the song spent one week in the top 50, reaching number 50, then dropped out the next week.

Track listings
Australian CD single
 "Sister"
 "Wait"

Australian remix CD
 "Sister" (Single mix)
 "Sister" (Urban Radio Mix)
 "Sister" (Platform 73 Mix)
 "Sister" (La Funk Mix)
 "Sister" (London House Mix)

UK single
 "Sister"
 "Sister" (Urban Radio Mix)
 "Wait"

UK cassette single
 "Sister"
 "Sister" (Tuff Sister Mix)

Charts

Weekly charts

Year-end charts

Certifications

Release history

References

1999 debut singles
1999 songs
ARIA Award-winning songs
Mushroom Records singles
Sister2Sister songs
Songs written by Pam Reswick
Songs written by Steve Werfel